Ypsolopha minotaurella is a moth of the family Ypsolophidae. It is known from Albania, Greece and Crete.

The wingspan is 17–18 mm.

References

External links
lepiforum.de

Ypsolophidae
Moths of Europe